Ponondougou is a village in northern Ivory Coast. It is in the sub-prefecture of Siempurgo, Boundiali Department, Bagoué Region, Savanes District. The population is mainly Senufos.

Ponondougou was a commune until March 2012, when it became one of 1126 communes nationwide that were abolished.

The parents of singer Ismaël Isaac are from Ponondougou.

Notes

Former communes of Ivory Coast
Populated places in Savanes District
Populated places in Bagoué